Sydney Rex Wakely-Smith (1930 – 5 December 2013) was a South African rally driver and philatelist. He was South African Rally Champion with Ewold van Bergen in 1964 and 1965. He was president of the Philatelic Federation of South Africa in 2004 and won medals for his collection of the philately of Mozambique.

Early life and family
Sydney Rex Wakely-Smith was born in Johannesburg in 1930. He was educated at St John's school. He married Ethne Denise Lambert in on the 31st October 1953, when he was 23 years old. They were married for 60 years before he sadly passed in Hillcrest, South Africa at 83 years old. They had three children and many grandchildren and great grandchildren.

Motor sport
Wakely Smith was South African Rally Champion with Ewold van Bergen in 1964 and 1965.

He was awarded Springbok colours for motor sport.

Philately
Wakely Smith inherited an interest in philately from his mother. He was a member of the Philatelic Society of Natal and president of the Philatelic Federation of South Africa in 2004. He specialised in the philately of Mozambique and won a Large Gold medal in South Africa for his exhibit of that country as well as a Large Silver medal at the international stamp exhibition in Dubai.

Other hobbies included ornithology and conchology.

Death
Wakely Smith died on 5 December 2013.

References

External links
https://dattosankureiji.wordpress.com/tag/rex-wakely-smith/
https://www.1820settlers.com/genealogy/familygroup.php?familyID=F37152&tree=master

1930 births
2013 deaths
People from Johannesburg
South African rally drivers
South African philatelists
Philately of Mozambique
South African ornithologists
Conchologists